Mulling may refer to:
 Mulling (spectroscopy), a sample preparation technique
 Mulling spices, a spice mixture
 Book of Mulling, an early Irish manuscript

See also 
 Mull (disambiguation)
 Mullings, a surname
 Mulled wine, a hot alcoholic beverage